An Adventure in Sound: Brass in Hi-Fi (also released as An Adventure in Sound - Brass) is an album by composer, arranger and conductor Pete Rugolo featuring performances recorded in 1956 and first released on the Mercury label in 1958.

Track listing
All compositions by Pete Rugolo, except where indicated.
 "My Mother's Eyes" (Abel Baer, L. Wolfe Gilbert) - 4:24
 "All the Things You Are" (Jerome Kern, Oscar Hammerstein II) - 3:07
 "Can't We Talk It Over" (Victor Young, Ned Washington) - 4:55
 "God Child" (George Wallington) - 3:12
 "Brass at Work" - 3:26
 "Temptation" (Nacio Herb Brown, Arthur Freed) - 3:05
 "Song for Tuba" - 3:02
 "A Rose for David" - 2:35
 "Everything Happens to Me (Matt Dennis, Tom Adair) - 3:44
 "Salute" - 3:31

Recorded a Capitol Studios in Los Angeles, CA on July 10, 1956 (track 3), October 31, 1956 (tracks 1, 2, 4 & 5) and November 21, 1956 (tracks 6-10).

Personnel
Pete Rugolo - arranger, conductor
Pete Candoli, Don Fagerquist (tracks 1, 2 & 4-10), Maynard Ferguson, Ray Linn, Don Paladino (track 3) - trumpet 
Milt Bernhart, Herbie Harper, Frank Rosolino - trombone (tracks 1, 2 & 4-10)
George Roberts - bass trombone (tracks 1, 2 & 4-10)
John Cave, Vincent DeRosa - French horn (tracks 1, 2 & 4-10)
Clarence Karella - tuba (tracks 1, 2 & 4-10)
Russ Freeman (track 3), André Previn (tracks 1, 2, 4 & 5), Claude Williamson (tracks 6-10) - piano
Barney Kessel (tracks 1, 2 & 4-10), Howard Roberts (track 3) - guitar
Joe Mondragon - bass
Shelly Manne - drums
Larry Bunker  - vibraphone, percussion (tracks 1, 2 & 4-10)

References

1958 albums
Pete Rugolo albums
Mercury Records albums
Albums arranged by Pete Rugolo
Albums conducted by Pete Rugolo

Albums recorded at Capitol Studios